Henrik Smedegaard (born June 6, 1985) is a retired Danish professional football player.

After terminating his contract with AC Horsens in the last day of the year 2012, he decided to retire from playing professionally in his age 27th, earlier on average. He said he will study for a master's degree in law.

External links
Vejle Boldklub profile
Official Danish Superliga stats
Danish national team profile

Living people
1985 births
Danish men's footballers
FC Midtjylland players
Ikast FS players
Vejle Boldklub players
AC Horsens players
Danish Superliga players
Association football defenders